Integral expression may refer to:

 Integral equation
 More generally, a mathematical expression involving one or more integrals
 Integer polynomial
 An algebraic expression which is not in fractional form, see algebraic fraction